San Andrés de Giles is a town in Buenos Aires Province, Argentina. It is the administrative seat of the San Andrés de Giles Partido.

External links

 www.san-andres-degiles.com.ar - Website with pictures and stories of the city
 Municipal website

Populated places in Buenos Aires Province